"BDZ" (an abbreviation for "bulldozer") is a song recorded by South Korean girl group Twice. Written and composed by J. Y. Park, it was released by Warner Music Japan on September 12, 2018, as a digital single from their first Japanese studio album of the same name.

Background and release
The song was pre-released as a digital single on August 17, 2018, along with its accompanying music video, and was officially released on September 12 by Warner Music Japan.

Composition
"BDZ", an electropop song, was composed by J. Y. Park, with the Japanese lyrics penned by Shoko Fujibayashi and Yu Shimoji. It is about "moving forward and pushing away obstacles like a bulldozer" and "conveys feelings of strength and starting anew." Park stated that it is "a song for fans and Twice to sing and enjoy together."

Music video
On August 17, 2018, the song's music video was released on YouTube. It was directed by Naive Creative Production, the team behind most of Twice's previous music videos.

A plot-heavy clip, which featured the women in a darker place and begins with an intro during which Sana, walks through a dystopian scene where everyone is fighting. She explains that the world was a happy place previously thanks to beings known as "Lovelies," which have since been kidnapped. Twice has decided to save the day and bring happiness back by rescuing the creatures, and as the song begins the nonet starts to break into a heavily protected house.

Throughout the rest of the video, Twice goes up against guards in a variety of innovative ways, while scenes of the women singing and dancing are interspersed. The group inevitably bring happiness back into the world by freeing nine purple and pink animated characters, who unleash their love on the girl group's former enemies.

Promotion
On August 31, 2018, Twice performed "BDZ" for the first time on Music Station, and it was performed on the opening stage of Tokyo Girls Collection the next day. "BDZ" was also performed during Twice 1st Arena Tour 2018 "BDZ", starting on September 29 in Chiba.

Korean version
The Korean version of "BDZ" was released on November 5, 2018, as the seventh track of Twice's sixth extended play (EP) Yes or Yes. The group performed the song during their comeback showcase for the EP, as well as on Korean music programs.

Charts

Weekly charts

Year-end chart

Certifications

Release history

References

2018 singles
2018 songs
J-pop songs
Japanese-language songs
Twice (group) songs
Songs written by Park Jin-young